is a Japanese actress and former member of the idol girl groups HKT48 and AKB48. In HKT48, she was a member of Team H.

She has been the lead performer of three HKT48 singles: "Hikaeme I Love You!" (2014), "12 Byō" (2015, with Sakura Miyawaki), and "Shekarashika!" (2015).

Career

2011–12: Pre-debut activities
On 10 July 2011, Kodama passed the first generation audition for HKT48. She made her first appearance as an HKT48 trainee member on 23 October, together with other first generation trainees at the "Flying Get National Handshake Event" in Seibu Dome. One month later, she debuted on stage at HKT48's newly built theater. The group performed a revival of SKE48 Team S's stage , with Kodama serving as the center.

In January 2012, Kodama was announced on the lineup for AKB48's 25th single "Give Me Five!". She provided vocals for the B-side "New Ship". This was the first time an HKT48 member participated in an AKB48 single. On 26 February, she visited Shiogama, Miyagi Prefecture with six other AKB48 members as part of AKB48's 2011 Miyagi earthquake charity project . On 4 March, she was promoted to a full member of HKT48's Team H, along with 15 other girls. Later that month, she was chosen to feature on AKB48's 26th single "Manatsu no Sounds Good!". This was the first time an HKT48 member featured on an AKB48 A-side single.

2013–16: Debut and rising popularity
HKT48 released its first single "Suki! Suki! Skip!" on 20 March 2013. On 28 April, the final day of AKB48's spring concert at the Nippon Budokan, Kodama was chosen to be a concurrent member of AKB48's Team A. From May to 8 June, AKB48 held their annual , an event that allows fans to vote their favourite members from AKB48 Group into the promotional line-up of AKB48's next single. Kodama received 18,145 votes and ranked 37th out of 283 members. She later sang on the "Koi Suru Fortune Cookie" B-side . On 19 June, she made her first appearance as a member of AKB48's Team A and performed at the AKB48 theater in Akihabara, Tokyo for the first time.

At AKB48's reshuffling event held on 24 February 2014, Kodama was moved from AKB48's Team A to Team K. In June, she ranked 21st at the annual AKB48 Senbatsu Sōsenkyo, and sang on the "Kokoro no Placard" B-side . On 31 August, she was chosen to center HKT48's fourth single "Hikaeme I Love You!". The single sold over 300,000 copies and was the 21st best-selling single of the year in Japan.

On 22 March 2015, she was chosen to center HKT48's fifth single "12 Byō", along with fellow member Sakura Miyawaki. Kodama ranked 17th at the annual AKB48 Senbatsu Sōsenkyo in June, making her the center of Undergirls (ranks 17 to 32). She later sang on "Halloween Night"'s main B-side . In October, HKT48 announced that its next single, "Shekarashika!", would be a collaboration with rock band Kishidan. Kodama was chosen to be the center of the single. "12 Byō" and "Shekarashika!" both sold around 300,000 copies and were the 20th and 22nd best-selling singles, respectively, of the year in Japan.

At the annual AKB48 Senbatsu Sōsenkyo in June 2016, Kodama received 60,591 votes and ranked 9th, making her a member of the main line-up of AKB48's 45th single, "Love Trip / Shiawase o Wakenasai". The single sold over 1,200,000 copies and was the third best-selling single of the year in Japan. On 27 July 27, Kodama released her first photobook, titled Rock On. With approximately 7,000 copies sold in the first week according to Oricon, it debuted at number-two on Oricon Photobook Chart.

2017–present: Hiatus and acting career
In mid-February 2017, Kodama ceased activities citing poor physical health. She returned on 14 April for the final performance of HKT48's Kantō concert tour at NHK Hall. At AKB48's 12 Anniversary concert on 8 December, it was announced that Kodama's concurrent position in AKB48's Team B would be ending. On 27 December, HKT48's management announced that Kodama was going on hiatus due to poor health condition. Her concurrent position in AKB48 was cancelled on 1 April 2018. 

On June 9, 2019, Kodama left HKT48 and switched agencies to Avex Asunaro to pursue an acting career. In March 2021, she revealed that her hiatus was due to bipolar disorder.

Discography

Filmography

Film

Television

Commercials

Bibliography

Photobooks 
  (July 2016, Wani Books) 
 Stay 25 (November 2022, Wani Books)

References

External links 

  

1996 births
Living people
HKT48 members
AKB48 members
Japanese idols
Japanese women pop singers
Musicians from Miyazaki Prefecture
Musicians from Fukuoka Prefecture
Universal Music Japan artists
King Records (Japan) artists
21st-century Japanese women singers
21st-century Japanese singers
Avex Group artists